This is a list of airports in Malta.



Airports 
Airports shown in bold have scheduled passenger service on commercial airlines.

Abandoned airports 
Safi
Ħal Far
Ta' Qali
Qrendi
Calafrana
Marsa

See also 
 Transport in Malta
 List of airports by ICAO code: L#LM – Malta
 Wikipedia:WikiProject Aviation/Airline destination lists: Europe#Malta

References 

Malta
 
Airports
Airports
Malta